Marcelle Larguier was a Malagasy political figure who served as the second First Lady of Madagascar from 1972 to 1975 during the presidency of her husband, General Gabriel Ramanantsoa.

Larguier held French nationality. She married Ramanantsoa on 26 May 1934, at a Catholic Church in the Faravohitra neighborhood of Antananarivo. The couple had three children - Christian, Gérard, and Jocelyne.

Ramanantsoa's presidency was marked by a period of ethnic and political turmoil in Madagascar. In response, Larguier, a French national and Madagascar's second first lady, maintained a low political profile and refrained from taking public stands on controversial issues during her tenure.   

Larguier survived her husband, who died on 9 May 1979.

References

Date of birth missing
Year of birth missing
Date of death missing
Year of death missing
First ladies of Madagascar